Ferdous Ahmed Qureshi (1941-2020) was a Bangladeshi politician and chairman of the Progressive Democratic Party.

Early life

Ferdous Ahmed Qureshi was born in 1941 to a Bengali Muslim family in Chittagong, Bengal Presidency (now Bangladesh). His family claimed descent from the Quraysh, an Arab tribe which the Islamic prophet Muhammad and many of his companions belong to.

Career
Qureshi served as president of the student political organization East Pakistan Chhatra League from 1967 to 1968.

During the Bangladesh Liberation War he edited the Daily Deshbangla newspaper. After the war, he led a faction of the Jatiya Janata Party. The party merged with the Bangladesh Nationalist Party (BNP) in May 1980, and Qureshi became joint secretary general of the BNP.

In 2004 he formed the Green Party of Bangladesh. During the rule of the caretaker government from 2007 to 2009 he called for the formation of alternate parties to be created in Bangladesh.

He formed the Progressive Democratic Party in July 2007. He joined the Jatiya Jukta Front, an alliance of political parties to compete in the parliamentary elections in 2008. The alliance broke up in the same year. He was the chairman of the PDP until his death.

References

1941 births
2020 deaths
Bangladeshi politicians
Bangladeshi journalists
People from Chittagong District
Bangladeshi people of Arab descent